"Chill" is a song by American singer-songwriter Anthony Amorim. It was released digitally on July 5, 2017.

Background 

The song is about wanting to spend time with a person that you enjoy being around. To describe the song, Amorim says, "It's about wanting to hang out with someone and just, you know, chill."

Release 
"Chill" was released through iTunes on July 5, 2017. It peaked at #8 on the iTunes Singer/Songwriter charts.

In August 2017, Amorim released the single on CD, with an instrumental and a cappella track, through Etsy. The CD's came in a bundle with "Chill-themed" merchandise, including posters, stickers, and merchandise from the "2004 era".

Track listing

References

2017 singles
2017 songs